= Speed limits in Latvia =

Laws about car speeds in Latvia

Standard speed limits in Latvia

The general speed limits in Latvia are:

- 50 km/h on public roads within an urban area
- 80 km/h on gravel roads outside an urban area
- 90 km/h on public roads outside an urban area
- 100-120 on some designated roads (only during March 1 – November 1)

Road traffic regulations also stipulate speed limits for motorways (Latvian: ātrgaitas ceļš) from 1 March till 1 December as 120 km/h (motorcycles, tricycles, quadricycles, passenger cars and heavy goods vehicles the laden mass of which does not exceed 7.5 t) and for buses - 100 km/h. As of April 2024, the only such motorway is Ķekavas apvedceļš.
